Flupropadine is a rodenticide. Originally made by May and Baker and tested on farms in the United Kingdom it was withdrawn from use by 1994. Flupropadine has a delayed action, and so rodents can have multiple feeds from the bait before being killed.

The molecule has two rings, one is a m-hexafluoroxylene, and the other is piperidine.
Flupropadine is made from 3,5-bis(trifluoromethyl)iodobenzene, propargyl alcohol, and 4-tert-butylpiperidine.

References

Rodenticides
Alkyne derivatives
Trifluoromethyl compounds
Piperidines
Tert-butyl compounds